LaBryan Ray (born December 5, 1997) is an American football defensive tackle who is a free agent. He played college football at Alabama.

Early years 
Ray attended James Clemens High School in Madison, Alabama. He was a five-star recruit and received offers from Alabama, Florida, Ole Miss, Tennessee, and Arkansas.

College career 
In his freshman season, Ray played in only six games due to suffering a foot injury. He recorded five tackles, 2.5 tackles for losses, and one sack for the season. In his second year, he played in all 15 games, and started one of them. In 2020, he recorded 39 tackles, which included 5.5 for losses, and 2.5 sacks. He also recorded two pass deflections, and two quarterback hurries. He later suffered a season-ending lower leg injury in a game against South Carolina. He recorded nine tackles, 1.5 of which were for losses, one sack, and one forced fumble on the year. He was redshirted at the end of the season.

Professional career

Ray was signed by the New England Patriots as an undrafted free agent on May 9, 2022. He was waived on August 30, 2022 and signed to the practice squad the next day. He signed a reserve/future contract on January 10, 2023. He was waived on February 17.

Legal issues 
On January 11, 2019, Ray refused to leave an establishment located in a shopping center, due to him being intoxicated. He was subsequently arrested, and transferred to the Tuscaloosa County Jail, where he was held on a $500 bond.

References

External links
 New England Patriots bio
 Alabama Crimson Tide bio

Living people
21st-century African-American people
African-American players of American football
People from Madison, Alabama
Players of American football from Alabama
American football defensive ends
American football defensive tackles
Alabama Crimson Tide football players
New England Patriots players
1997 births